Daniel Epstein is the name of:
 Daniel Epstein (pianist) (born 1946), American pianist
 Daniel Mark Epstein (born 1948), poet and biographer
 Daniel Z. Epstein, American lawyer